Susanne may refer to:

Susanne (given name), a feminine given name (including a list of people with the name)
, later USS SP-411, a United States Navy patrol boat in commission from 1917 to 1919
, the proposed name and designation for a vessel the Navy considered for service during World War I but never acquired
Susanne (1950 film), a Danish film directed by Torben Anton Svendsen
Susanne (1961 film), a Swedish film directed by Elsa Colfach
 "Susanne" (song), by Weezer

See also
 
Suzanne (disambiguation)
Susanna (disambiguation)
Susana (disambiguation)
Susann
Zuzana